Diana Zagainova (born 20 June 1997 in Vilnius, Lithuania) is a Lithuanian triple jumper.

On 30 June 2019 in La Chaux-de-Fonds, Diana Zagainova broke the Lithuanian record with a mark of 14.43 m (+ 1,8 m/s). She improves her personal best by 30 centimetres and adds 17 centimetres to the previous national record set by Dovilė Dzindzaletaitė 12 days prior.

Achievements

References

External links
 

1997 births
Living people
Sportspeople from Vilnius
Lithuanian female triple jumpers
Competitors at the 2017 Summer Universiade
Athletes (track and field) at the 2020 Summer Olympics
Olympic athletes of Lithuania